The Blind Giant Is Dancing is a play by Australian playwright Stephen Sewell. It received the 1985 New South Wales Premier's Literary Award.

Plot
A passionate examination of the way political power can corrupt the individual and society at large

First production
The Blind Giant Is Dancing was first produced by the State Theatre Company of South Australia on 15 October 1983 with the following cast:

Graham White / Bruce Fitzgerald: Russell Kiefel

Mr Carew / Greg: Robert Grubb

Michael Wells: Stuart McCreery

Allen Fitzgerald: Geoffrey Rush

Louise Kraus: Jacqy Phillips

Jane: Robynne Bourne

Rose Draper: Gillian Jones

Janice Lang / Robin: Melita Jurisic

Bob Lang / Sir Leslie Harris: John Wood

Ramon Gris: Igor Sas

Doug Fitzgerald: Peter Cummins

Eileen Fitzgerald: Kerry Walker

Director, Neil Armfield

Designer, Stephen Curtis

Composer, Alan John

Lighting Designer, Nigel Levings

Revivals 
The play was revived by Neil Armfield for Belvoir in 1995, with Russell Kiefel, Gillian Jones and Kerry Walker from the original cast, plus Hugo Weaving, Cate Blanchett, Peter Carroll, Jason Clarke, Jacek Koman, Keith Robinson and Steve Rodgers.

In 2016 Belvoir performed a second revival directed by Eamon Flack. Dan Spielman took the leading role, with the cast including Yael Stone, Genevieve Lemon, Geoff Morrell, Zahra Newman and Ben Wood. Russell Kiefel made his third appearance in the play, this time as Doug Fitzgerald, father of the main character.

References

Australian plays
1983 plays